Autoball is a variant of association football where two or more drivers in cars compete against each other with the aim of scoring more goals than the opponent.

History

In 1933, autoball was founded by German racing driver . In the 1970s, autoball was popular in Brazil but was banned due to the 1973 oil crisis.

German television host Stefan Raab founded television show TV total Autoball.

References

1933 establishments in Germany
1970s fads and trends
Association football variants
Sports originating in Germany